Clodia (born Claudia, c. 95 or 94 BC), nicknamed Quadrantaria ("Quarter", from quadrantarius, the price of a visit to the public baths), Nola ("The Unwilling", from the verb nolo, in sarcastic reference to her alleged wantonness), Medea Palatina ("Medea of the Palatine") by Cicero (see below), and occasionally referred to in scholarship as Clodia Metelli ("Metellus's Clodia"), was one of three known daughters of the ancient Roman patrician Appius Claudius Pulcher.

Like many other women of the Roman elite, Clodia was very well educated in Greek and Philosophy, with a special talent for writing poetry. Her life, which was characterized by perpetual scandal, is immortalized in the writings of Marcus Tullius Cicero and, it is generally believed, in the poems of Gaius Valerius Catullus.

Biography

Early life
Clodia Metelli was born into the ancient Roman family of Claudii.  This was an established, aristocratic family whose history stretched back into the legends of Ancient Rome and who were active in the political construct of the City serving as consuls and senators onwards from the third century BCE.   She was born circa 97 BC, a daughter of Appius Claudius Pulcher, but her mother is unknown. Many historians believe she was a Caecilia Metella, possibly Caecilia Metella Balearica, or her cousin, Caecilia Metella daughter of Lucius Caecilius Metellus Diadematus. Another theory is that she was a Servilia Caepione. Clodia had three brothers: Appius Claudius Pulcher (consul in 54 BC), Gaius Claudius Pulcher (praetor in 56 BC), and Publius Clodius Pulcher (tribune of the plebs in 58 BC); and four sisters, the younger two of whom were married to Quintus Marcius Rex and Lucullus respectively. It is not certain whether Clodia was the eldest or a middle daughter, it is only known that she was not the youngest sister. Along with her brother Clodius, she changed her patrician name from Claudia to Clodia, with a plebeian connotation.

The Claudii Family History

This was an ancient patrician family, meaning they belonged to the Roman elite.  Roman society was divided into two groups, the patricians and the plebeians, the former carrying more political power than the latter.  The Claudii family held an established place in the legends of Rome, all paying tribute to their courage and nobility.  An example of such stories being when a statue of Phrygian Goddess Cybele was being transported to Rome on a barge, but the barge became grounded in the riverbank mud.  The statue was accompanied by some of the noblest Roman women one of whom was a member of the Claudii family called Claudia.  She prayed to be able to move the barge as proof of her chastity, and this she accomplished.  Such stories laid the foundation for the high regard in which the Gens Claudii was held in the eyes of the general public.

Marriage
Clodia was married to Quintus Caecilius Metellus Celer, her first cousin, with whom she had a daughter Caecilia Metella. The marriage was not happy. Clodia had several affairs with married men (probably including the poet Catullus) and slaves. Arguments with Metellus Celer were constant, often in public. When he died in strange circumstances in 59 BC, Clodia was suspected of poisoning him.

Controversies
As a widow, Clodia became known for taking several other lovers, including Marcus Caelius Rufus, Catullus's friend. This particular affair caused an immense scandal. After the relationship with Caelius was over in 56 BC, Clodia publicly accused him of attempted poisoning. The accusation led to a murder charge and trial. Caelius' defense advocate was Cicero, who took a harsh approach against her, recorded in his speech Pro Caelio. Cicero had a personal interest in the case, as Clodia's brother Clodius was Cicero's most bitter political enemy. Cicero accused Clodia of being a seducer and a drunkard in Rome and in Baiae, and alluded to the persistent rumors of an incestuous relationship with Clodius. Cicero stated that he "would [attack Caelius' accusers] still more vigorously, if I had not a quarrel with that woman's [Clodia's] husband—brother, I meant to say; I am always making this mistake. At present I will proceed with moderation ... for I have never thought it my duty to engage in quarrels with any woman, especially with one whom all men have always considered everybody's friend rather than anyone's enemy." He declared her a disgrace to her family and nicknamed Clodia the Medea of the Palatine. Caelius was found not guilty.

Plutarch claims that Cicero's own marriage to Terentia suffered from Terentia's persistent suspicions that Cicero was conducting an illicit affair with Clodia.

Death
After the trial no definite reference is heard of Clodia, and the date of her death is unknown. Cicero refers to a Clodia in 44 BC, but the lack of female personal names (praenomina) in Latin makes it difficult to specify whether this refers to the infamous Clodia or a sister.

Identification with Lesbia

The poet Catullus wrote several love poems about a frequently unfaithful woman he called Lesbia, identified in the mid-second century AD by the writer Apuleius (Apologia 10) as a "Clodia". This practice of replacing actual names with ones of identical metrical value was frequent in Latin poetry of that era. In modern times, the resulting identification of Lesbia with Clodia Metelli, based largely on her portrayal by Cicero, is usually treated as accepted fact, despite occasional challenges.

The predominant view, however, identifies Clodia with Lesbia primarily on the basis of Catullus 79.1-2:

"Pulcher", the Latin word for "beautiful" (see line 1 above), is also the cognomen of Clodia's brother, Publius Clodius Pulcher. This is the only one of Catullus' poems in which a character named "Lesbius", the masculine form of the name, appears and Lesbia is present in close proximity. Accusations of incest (as here) against the brother and sister also appear in Cicero. Reading Publius Clodius Pulcher for "Lesbius" makes one element of the poem a pun on his name and another a reminder of one of the political attacks Cicero aimed at P. Clodius Pulcher.

Cultural depictions
 Clodia makes several appearances in the Roma Sub Rosa series of historical mystery novels by the American author Steven Saylor.
 Clodia plays a significant role in several books of the SPQR series by John Maddox Roberts.
 Clodia also plays a significant role in the novel Lustrum (Conspirata in the US) by Robert Harris, the second book in a trilogy about the life of Cicero. She makes a final appearance in the third book, Dictator, where Cicero shames her into obscurity as retribution for her actions against his wife, Terentia.
 Clodia is a central character in the novel Clodia by Robert DeMaria.
 Clodia plays a role in the Ides of March, an epistolary novel by Thornton Wilder covering the events leading to the assassination of Julius Caesar. The author describes Clodia's relationship with Catullus and suggests that Clodia's scandalous lifestyle is inspired by anger at the perceived hypocrisy of her upbringing and by being abused as a child.
 Historical Consultant Jonathan Stamp of the HBO/BBC series Rome identifies Clodia as the primary basis for the character of Atia of the Julii as little detail is known of the historical Atia.
 Clodia and Catullus are the main characters in Counting the Stars, a novel by Helen Dunmore.

Family tree

See also
 Women in ancient Rome

Notes

References

Further reading
 English translations of Catullus' "Lesbia" poems
 Cicero's defence speeches: Pro Caelio
 W.J. Tatum, The Patrician Tribune. Publius Clodius Pulcher, Chapel Hill 1999.
 L. Fezzi, Il tribuno Clodio, Roma-Bari 2008
 Marilyn B. Skinner, Clodia Metelli: The Tribune's Sister (Women in Antiquity), Oxford 2011.

External links

90s BC births
1st-century BC Roman women
1st-century BC Romans
Claudii Pulchri
Clodii
Year of death unknown